The Great Britain women's national Australian rules football team is known as the Great Britain Swans. The team is made up of the best British born players selected from clubs of in England, Wales and Scotland, and occasional appearances from British players playing for clubs in Australia.

The Swans are the reigning European Champions after defeating Ireland 1.2 (8) to 0.2 (2) in the Grand Final of the 2010 AFL Europe Championship

In 2017, they competed in the AFL International Cup for the first time, finishing third. This is the best-ever result by a Great Britain side at an International Cup.

The Great Britain men's national Australian rules football team are called the Great Britain Bulldogs.

History 
The GB Swans were established in January 2016 by two England Vixens players, Charlotte-Ellen Eales and Lisa Wilson. The team was created with its sights set on entering the International Cup in Melbourne in 2017. Their inaugural coach was Garth Nevin, assisted by Ian Mitchell and Lauren Spark.

In 2017, the GB Swans made their first appearance at the International Cup in Melbourne, finishing third.

The Swans are currently coached by Ian Mitchell and the team is managed by Phil Martin.

International competition

International Cup

AFL Europe Championship

Results (2016-present) 
Scores and results list Great Britain's points tally first.

2016

2017

2018

See also 
Australian rules football in England
Australian rules football in Scotland
Australian rules football in Wales
Australian Football International Cup

References

External links 

Australian rules football in Great Britain
National Australian rules football teams
Australian rules football